The 1960 Australian Touring Car Championship was a CAMS sanctioned motor racing title for drivers of Appendix J Touring Cars. The title, which was the inaugural Australian Touring Car Championship, was contested over a single 20 lap, 75 mile race held on 1 February 1960 at the Gnoo Blas Motor Racing Circuit near Orange in New South Wales. The race was the first to be run under Appendix J Touring Car regulations, ushering in a new era that would last until January 1965 when CAMS replaced Appendix J with Group C for Improved Production Touring Cars.

The championship was won by David McKay driving a Jaguar Mark 1 3.4 Litre.

Race
This, the first Australian touring car race to be run under a set of national regulations which defined a level of modification, was dominated by the three Jaguar Mark 1 drivers. The journalist racer David McKay, remembered for his efforts promoting racing cars and sports cars with his Scuderia Veloce team, claimed the racing achievement he is best remembered for, in a touring car race.

A single day of practice was held on Sunday, 31 January, with the fastest lap times from official practice used to set the grid for the race the following day. McKay set the fastest lap time of 2:40 to take pole position, with Bill Pitt and Ron Hodgson, also in Jaguars, setting times of 2:41 and 2:42 respectively to line up second and third on the grid. Later in the day, Hodgson set a lap time of 2:39 in unofficial practice. Multiple cars, including the three Jaguars, suffered overheating problems during the day, while Hodgson also had gearbox troubles with the car jumping out of gear. Roy Sawyer blew an engine which was rebuilt overnight.

Hodgson led away from the start, getting the jump on McKay and Pitt, with the three Jaguars quickly pulling away from the rest of the field. All three drivers missed their brake markers going into Windsock Corner on lap 1, with Hodgson running wide and McKay and Pitt both spinning. This gave Hodgson a lead heading into lap 2 but McKay caught him halfway through the lap. Hodgson again left his braking too late at Windsock, allowing McKay, Pitt and several other cars through. By the time Hodgson restarted his car, he was around one minute down on McKay and Pitt. Hodgson was able to regain third place within the next lap, leaving Max Volkers in fourth while Ian Geoghegan led a battle for fifth until blowing a head gasket.

By lap 14, McKay had a lead of 26 seconds over Pitt, while rain was beginning to fall over the circuit. Sawyer spun his car coming over the crest at Connaghans Corner, hitting the inside bank and rolling. Jack van Schaik narrowly missed Sawyer's car while Ken Miller scraped his roof on one of Sawyer's bumpers. Des West stopped to help Sawyer escape the car while the driver of a Ford Zephyr had also stopped, their car blocking the track. After helping Sawyer, West burned his hands while restarting his own car. McKay was able to slow safely as he approached the scene but was forced to use his car to move the stationary Zephyr out of the way. This allowed Pitt to close the gap and he took the lead when McKay spun on the following lap. However, the overdrive mechanism in Pitt's car began to fail and McKay was able to retake the lead with two laps remaining. McKay led to the finish, six seconds ahead of Pitt, with Hodgson more than a minute behind. Volkers was the best of the rest, finishing one lap down in fourth place.

Results

Statistics
 Pole position: David McKay, 2:40
 Fastest lap: David McKay, 2:35, 140 km/h (87 m.p.h.)
 Average speed of winning car: 133 km/h (80 m.p.h.)
 There were 44 starters of which 31 finished.
 Attendance: 7,000

References

Further reading
 David McKay, First Touring Titles Decided, Modern Motor, April 1960, pages 22–23 & 80-81
 Orange Road Races – Feb. 1st, Australian Motor Sports, February 1960, pages 68 & 71
 Peter Wherrett, Speedy Orange, Sports Car World, March 1960, page 52
 Mark Oastler, Des West's 'Appendix J' Holden 48-215, Australian Muscle Car, Jan/Feb 2011, pages 36–63

External links
 Official V8 Supercar website (contains historical ATCC information)
 Simon Brady's images from Gnoo Blas - February 1960  - page 1
 Simon Brady's images from Gnoo Blas - February 1960  - page 2
 Images from Gnoo Blas - February 1960

Australian Touring Car Championship seasons
Touring Car Championship
Motorsport at Gnoo Blas